Bo Diddley is the debut studio album by American rock and roll musician Bo Diddley. It collects several of his most influential and enduring songs, which were released as singles between 1955 and 1958. Chess Records issued the album in 1958. In 2012, it was ranked number 216 on [[Rolling Stone's 500 Greatest Albums of All Time|Rolling Stone'''s 500 Greatest Albums of All Time]] list alongside his second album, Go Bo Diddley (1959). The ranking of the album pair dropped to number 455 in the 2020 update of the list.

 Critical reception 
AllMusic's Matthew Greenwald gave Bo Diddley five out of five stars and recommended it as one of the "few" essential albums for listeners who want to "play rock & roll, real'' rock & roll". Greenwald said that its 12 songs are exemplary of the Bo Diddley beat: "This is one of the greatest rock sounds that you're likely to hear, and it's all on this one record, too."

In 2022, the recording was inducted into the Blues Hall of Fame, as a 'Classic of Blues Recording – Album'.

Track listing

Personnel
From the CD reissue liner notes:
Bo Diddley – vocals, guitar
Jerome Green – co-lead vocals on "Bring It to Jerome", maracas
Frank Kirkland – drums
Clifton James – drums
Otis Spann – piano
Lafayette Leake – piano
Willie Dixon – bass
Billy Boy Arnold – harmonica on "I'm a Man"
Little Walter – harmonica on "Diddley Daddy"
Lester Davenport – harmonica on "Pretty Thing" and "Bring It to Jerome"
Little Willie Smith – harmonica on "Diddy Wah Diddy"
Jody Williams – guitar
The Moonglows – backing vocals on "Diddley Daddy" and "Diddy Wah Diddy"
Peggy Jones – backing vocals on "Hey! Bo Diddley", guitar
The Flamingos – backing vocals on "Hey! Bo Diddley"
Chuck Stewart – cover art

References

External links 
 

1958 debut albums
Bo Diddley albums
1958 compilation albums
Chess Records compilation albums
Albums produced by Leonard Chess
Albums produced by Phil Chess
Albums produced by Bo Diddley